
The Bare Mountain Range is a mountain range in southern Nye County, Nevada, in the United States. Bare Mountain and Wildcat Peak are the high points of the range.

Geography
The north end of the range borders Beatty on the Amargosa River. The Bullfrog Hills lie to the northwest of Beatty. Yucca Mountain lies about nine miles to the east across Crater Flat. The range borders the central and northeast Amargosa Desert, which also trends northwest by southeast. U.S. Route 95 runs in the Amargosa Valley along the south edge of the range and turns at Beatty to continue north through Oasis Valley.

In the southeast of the range, Wildcat Peak rises to 

Bare Mountain Range was descriptively named for the bare summits.

See also
Amargosa toad

References

External links

Bare Mountain region- features, photographs, placenames

Amargosa Desert
Mountain ranges of Nevada
Mountain ranges of the Mojave Desert
Mountain ranges of Nye County, Nevada
Mountain ranges of the Great Basin